"The Catastrophe of Success" is an essay by Tennessee Williams about art and the artist's role in society. It is often included in paper editions of The Glass Menagerie.

A version of this essay first appeared in The New York Times, November 30, 1947, four days before the opening of A Streetcar Named Desire (previously titled "The Poker Night"). Another version of this essay, titled "A Streetcar Named Success" is sometimes used as an introduction to A Streetcar Named Desire.

References

External links
“The Catastrophe of Success” by Tennessee Williams: An Informational Text for the Common Core

Essays by Tennessee Williams
Works originally published in The New York Times
1947 essays